Manhasset Hills is a hamlet and census-designated place (CDP) in the Town of North Hempstead in Nassau County, on Long Island, in New York, United States. The population was 3,592 at the 2010 census. Neighboring communities include Herricks, North Hills, North New Hyde Park, and Lake Success.

History 
By the late 1950s, much of the land in Manhasset Hills had been developed by developers. One of the last major developments to be built was the Cherrywood Homes development, which was built on a 24-acre tract by Barney and Martin Spiegel. The development was built with 88 split-level houses designed by A.H. Salkowitz, and was constructed on one of the last remaining major undeveloped tracts of land available in Manhasset Hills.

In the 1980s and 1990s, roughly 1,000 Manhasset Hills residents attempted to prevent the State of New York from placing a group home in their neighborhood for people with mental disabilities. Many were concerned that their property values would decrease because of the group home's presence, and attempted to change a law in order to prevent the home from being established. The residents were successful in preventing the group home from being established in their community, and the home was instead established in nearby New Hyde Park. 

The Long Island Motor Parkway used to run along the northern border of the hamlet.

Geography

Economy 
Manhasset Hills is a bedroom community of the City of New York and, as such, a significant number of Manhasset Hills residents commute to/from New York for work.

The hamlet itself is predominantly residential in character, with the heavy majority of lots within the village being zoned for single-family homes. The only area of Manhasset Hills zoned for commercial or industrial uses is located at the extreme southwest corner of the hamlet.

Demographics

As of the census of 2000, there were 3,661 people, 1,224 households, and 1,068 families residing in the CDP. The population density was 6,175.1 per square mile (2,395.8/km2). There were 1,235 housing units at an average density of 2,083.1/sq mi (808.2/km2). The racial makeup of the CDP was 70.39% White, 0.36% African American, 0.03% Native American, 27.04% Asian, 0.66% from other races, and 1.53% from two or more races. Hispanic or Latino of any race were 3.31% of the population.

There were 1,224 households, out of which 37.2% had children under the age of 18 living with them, 81.2% were married couples living together, 4.2% had a female householder with no husband present, and 12.7% were non-families. 10.5% of all households were made up of individuals, and 7.4% had someone living alone who was 65 years of age or older. The average household size was 2.99 and the average family size was 3.22.

In the CDP, the population was spread out, with 24.2% under the age of 18, 6.0% from 18 to 24, 20.3% from 25 to 44, 29.0% from 45 to 64, and 20.4% who were 65 years of age or older. The median age was 45 years. For every 100 females, there were 92.0 males. For every 100 females age 18 and over, there were 89.1 males.

The median income for a household in the CDP was $103,540, and the median income for a family was $109,613. Males had a median income of $78,223 versus $48,542 for females. The per capita income for the CDP was $45,009. About 2.3% of families and 2.8% of the population were below the poverty line, including 4.5% of those under age 18 and 3.9% of those age 65 or over.

Parks and recreation 
The Town of North Hempstead owns and maintains two parks within the hamlet:

 Clinton G. Martin Park
 Ridder's Pond Park

Government

Town representation 
As Manhasset Hills is an unincorporated part of the Town of North Hempstead, it is directly governed by the town's government in Manhasset.

As of June 2021, Manhasset Hills is represented on the Town Board by Peter J. Zuckerman, and is located in its 2nd Council District.

Representation in higher government

Nassau County representation 
Manhasset Hills is located in Nassau County's 10th Legislative district, which as of January 2023 is represented in the Nassau County Legislature by Mazi Melesa Pilip (R–Great Neck).

New York State representation

New York State Assembly 
Manhasset Hills is located in the New York State Assembly's 16th Assembly district, which as of September 2021 is represented by Gina Sillitti (D–Manorhaven).

New York State Senate 
Manhasset Hills is located in the New York State Senate's 7th State Senate district, which as of September 2021 is represented in the New York State Senate by Anna Kaplan (D–North Hills).

Federal representation

United States Congress 
Manhasset Hills is located in New York's 3rd congressional district, which as of September 2021 is represented in the United States Congress by Tom Suozzi (D–Glen Cove).

United States Senate 
Like the rest of New York, Manhasset Hills is represented in the United States Senate by Charles Schumer (D) and Kirsten Gillibrand (D).

Politics 
In the 2016 U.S. presidential election, the majority of Manhasset Hills voters voted for Hillary Clinton (D).

Education

School districts 
Manhasset Hills is primarily located within the boundaries of (and is thus served by) the Herricks Union Free School District, although the westernmost portion of the hamlet is located within the boundaries of the Great Neck Union Free School District. As such, children who reside within Manhasset Hills and attend public schools go to school in one of these two districts depending on where they reside within the hamlet.

Library districts 
Manhasset Hills is located within the boundaries of (and is thus served by) the Great Neck Library District and the Shelter Rock Library District. The boundaries of these two districts within the hamlet roughly correspond to the school district boundaries.

Infrastructure

Transportation

Road 
A small portion of the Northern State Parkway traverses the northeastern corner of the hamlet; the historic Long Island Motor Parkway used to pass through Manhasset Hills, as well. The southwestern corner of the hamlet touches Union Turnpike, and the southwestern tip of the hamlet is at Hillside Avenue. 

Other major roads which travel through Manhasset Hills include Denton Avenue, Marcus Avenue, New Hyde Park Road, Old Courthouse Road, and Shelter Rock Road.

Rail 
No rail lines pass through Manhasset Hills. The nearest Long Island Rail Road stations to the hamlet are New Hyde Park on the Main Line and East Williston on the Oyster Bay Branch.

Bus 
The n25 and n26 run along New Hyde Park Road at the western edge of the hamlet. These two bus lines are operated by Nassau Inter-County Express (NICE).

Utilities

Natural gas 
National Grid USA provides natural gas to homes and businesses that are hooked up to natural gas lines in Manhasset Hills.

Power 
PSEG Long Island provides power to all homes and businesses within Manhasset Hills.

The former Motor Parkway's right-of-way now serves as the route of a power line through the area.

Sewage 
All of Manhasset Hills is connected to sanitary sewers, which are part of the Nassau County Sewage District, which handles and treats the hamlet's sanitary waste.

Water 
Manhasset Hills is located within the boundaries of the Garden City Park Water District and the Manhasset–Lakeville Water District. The boundaries of these two districts within the hamlet roughly correspond to the school district boundaries.

References

Town of North Hempstead, New York
Census-designated places in New York (state)
Hamlets in New York (state)
Census-designated places in Nassau County, New York
Hamlets in Nassau County, New York